Lines & Circles is the third studio album released by American boy band O-Town, and the first to be released by the band since their reunion as a four-piece in 2011. The album was recorded over the course of three years, with a number of writers and producers, including Ryan Tedder.

The album was initially due for release on August 3, 2014, but was delayed by three weeks to August 25, due to final touches being made to the production. The band released a mock video on YouTube which claimed the reason for the delay was due to band member Erik Michael Estrada changing the cover art to resemble the cover for the single "Anaconda" by Nicki Minaj. The lead single from the album, "Skydive", was released on July 27, 2014, after being pushed back from the initial release date of June 19, 2014.

Background
The band officially reformed as a four-piece in 2011, without original band member Ashley Parker Angel. Angel declined a return to the group, despite being approached by more than two of the band members. The band released an official statement which said that they "understood Ashley's decision", and "will continue as a band without his input", and "wish him all of the best in his future ventures". The band later announced the album's release date to be August 4, 2014 in a video via their official YouTube account.

Songwriters
The band worked with a number of songwriters and producers on the album, which was recorded over the space of three years. High-profile contributors include country singer-songwriter Phillip LaRue, who contributed to "Chasin' After You" and "Rewind", and OneRepublic lead singer Ryan Tedder, who co-wrote and co-produced "I Won't Lose". Band member Jacob Underwood co-wrote five of the songs on the album, while Erik Michael Estrada co-wrote title track "Lines and Circles". It is notable that band member Dan Miller is the only band member not to receive a writing credit on the album.

The album is notable for covering a number of different genres. "Chasin' After You" is a Michael Jackson-esque dancefloor filler with soft, harmonic high-range melodies on the hook. "Skydive" is a soaring boy band ballad with pianos and drums aplenty. "Rewind" is an electro-rock mash up with a 'We Will Rock You'-esque beat accompanied perfectly by an electro-hopping bassline. "Playing With Fire" has a One Direction reminiscent guitar-lead intro, but soon leaps into a R&B fusion chorus with keyboards and harmonies aplenty. "I Won't Lose" is an acoustically-lead ballad that falls somewhere in the boundary between Take That and The Script. "Right Kind of Wrong" has possibly the strongest influences of R&B on the record, although soon crosses the threshold into pop-rap with a rap breakdown. "Buried Alive" is a reggae-tinged acoustic jive. "Got to Go" is a classic early 2000s boy band ballad. "Sometimes Love Just Ain't Enough" is a laid-back melodic ballad, drawing comparisons to early material from the Backstreet Boys. "Lines and Circles" is a heavy instrumentally-lead electro-pop ballad.

Track listing

References

2014 albums
O-Town albums